Saint Valerius of Saragossa (d. 315 AD) is the patron saint of Saragossa. He was bishop of this city from 290 until his death. He assisted at the Council of Elvira. His feast day is January 29.

History
Saint Valerius (4th century) was bishop of Caesaraugusta (Saragossa), participated in the council of Elbira (Granada), around the year 306, had Saint Vicente Mártir as deacon Vincent of Saragossa first [martyr] of Spain. Both Valerius and Vincent suffered imprisonment under Diocletian.
Valerius was held captive in Valencia during Diocletian's persecution, apparently he saved his life and perhaps he was banished to an undetermined area of the Aragonese Pyrenees. Valerius was exiled for a time to a place called Enet, near Barbastro.
In 1050, some remains that were considered his were transferred to Roda de Isábena and, from 1118, after the entry into Zaragoza of the Christian troops of Alfonso I the Battler, these remains were transferred to Zaragoza in successive shipments throughout several decades.

Venerated ever since by the people of [Zaragoza], he is the patron saint of the city.
An idealised portrait of this Bishop is found in the magnificent Pantaleão, Zaragoza.

Why rosconero?
This sweet has traditionally been associated with festivities and that in Roman times, at Saturnalia, a bean was hidden around the house and the slave who found it was free until spring.

According to the Provincial Association of Confectionery and Pastry Entrepreneurs of Zaragoza, which brings together some 60 establishments, for San Valero the Aragonese usually consume more than 150,000 roscones to sweeten the after-meal.

An idealised portrait of this Bishop is found in the magnificent Pantaleão, Zaragoza.

Veneration

A chapel dedicated to him can be found at La Seo Cathedral. It includes a baroque entryway of gilded wood from the seventeenth century with scenes of the saints Valerius, Vincent, and Lawrence.

References 

315 deaths
4th-century Christian saints
People from Zaragoza
Saints from Hispania
Year of birth unknown